Phalacrocera is a genus of crane fly in the family Cylindrotominae.

Biology
The larvae of the genus Phalacrocera live on mosses. Adults are to be found in damp wooded habitats.

Distribution
Canada, United States, Myanmar, Taiwan, India, China, Japan, Europe, Most species have a fairly limited known ranges, with the exception of P. replicata which is fairly cosmopolitan in North America, Northern Europe and Northern Asia.

Species
P. angustaxillaris Alexander, 1972
P. formosae Alexander, 1923
P. manipurensis Alexander, 1964
P. messura Alexander, 1972
P. nigrolutea Alexander, 1972
P. occidentalis Alexander, 1928
P. replicata (Linnaeus, 1758)
P. sikkimensis Alexander, 1972
P. tarsalba Alexander, 1936
P. tipulina Osten Sacken, 1865
P. vancouverensis Alexander, 1927

References

Cylindrotomidae
Diptera of North America
Diptera of Asia
Diptera of Europe